Thysanina is a genus of African araneomorph spiders first described by Eugène Simon in 1910. Originally placed with the Liocranidae, it was moved to the Corinnidae in 2000, and to the Trachelidae in 2014.

Species
 it contains six species:
Thysanina absolvo Lyle & Haddad, 2006 – South Africa
Thysanina capensis Lyle & Haddad, 2006 – South Africa
Thysanina gracilis Lyle & Haddad, 2006 – Namibia, South Africa
Thysanina serica Simon, 1910 (type) – Namibia, South Africa
Thysanina similis Lyle & Haddad, 2006 – Tanzania
Thysanina transversa Lyle & Haddad, 2006 – South Africa

References

Araneomorphae genera
Taxa named by Eugène Simon
Trachelidae